Monsignor Joseph Thomas Arthur Maheux, SM, OBE, FRSC (22 June 1884 – 30 August 1967) was a Canadian priest and historian. He was a leading proponent of Canadian unity as well as a trenchant critic of Quebec society.

He was president of the Société du parler français au Canada from 1924 to 1925 and president of the Canadian Historical Association from 1948 to 1949.

Maheux was appointed an Officer of the Order of the British Empire in 1943 "For patriotic work". He received a Guggenheim Fellowship in 1954, the J. B. Tyrrell Historical Medal in 1959, and the Pierre Chauveau Medal in 1963. In 1967, he was among the first group of recipients of the Order of Canada.

Principal works 

 Ton histoire est une épopée - Nos débuts sous le régime anglais, 1941.
 Le Canada parle à la France, 1942.
 Canada Victorious, Happy and Glorious, 1943.
 Pourquoi sommes-nous divisés?, 1943.
 L'Université Laval et la culture française au Canada, 1952.

References 

1884 births
1967 deaths
20th-century Canadian Roman Catholic priests
Recipients of the Medal of Service of the Order of Canada
Canadian Officers of the Order of the British Empire
Fellows of the Royal Society of Canada
20th-century Canadian historians
Canadian archivists
Presidents of the Canadian Historical Association
Université Laval alumni
University of Paris alumni
Academic staff of Université Laval
Canadian nationalists
Historians of Canada
Royal Canadian Geographical Society fellows
Historians from Quebec